News Is Made at Night is a 1939 American comedy film directed by Alfred L. Werker and written by John Larkin. The film stars Preston Foster, Lynn Bari, Russell Gleason, George Barbier, Eddie Collins and Minor Watson. The film was released on July 21, 1939, by 20th Century Fox.

Plot

Cast        
Preston Foster as Steve Drum
Lynn Bari as Maxine Thomas
Russell Gleason as Albert Hockman
George Barbier as Clanahan
Eddie Collins as Billiard
Minor Watson as Charles Coulton AKA Clifford Mussey
Charles Halton as Lt. Governor Elmer Hinge
Paul Harvey as Inspector Melrose
Richard Lane as Barney Basely
Charles Lane as District Attorney Rufe Reynolds
Betty Compson as Kitty Truman
Paul Fix as Joe Luddy
Paul Guilfoyle as Bat Randall

References

External links 
 

1939 films
20th Century Fox films
American comedy films
1939 comedy films
Films directed by Alfred L. Werker
American black-and-white films
1930s English-language films
1930s American films